Tendai Chimusasa (born January 28, 1971 in Nyanga) is a retired Zimbabwean long-distance runner. He carried the flag for his native country at the opening ceremony of the 1996 Summer Olympics in Atlanta, Georgia. He won the Lisbon Half Marathon 1992  and Berlin Half Marathon in 1994 and 1997.

Chimusasa was also a cross country runner and won the Eurocross meeting in Luxembourg in 1994 and 1996.

Achievements

1998 World Half Marathon Championships - eighth place
1996 World Half Marathon Championships - bronze medal

References

External links

1971 births
Athletes (track and field) at the 1992 Summer Olympics
Athletes (track and field) at the 1994 Commonwealth Games
Athletes (track and field) at the 1996 Summer Olympics
Athletes (track and field) at the 2000 Summer Olympics
Commonwealth Games silver medallists for Zimbabwe
Commonwealth Games medallists in athletics
Living people
Olympic athletes of Zimbabwe
Sportspeople from Manicaland Province
Zimbabwean male long-distance runners
Zimbabwean male marathon runners
Medallists at the 1994 Commonwealth Games